Santa Clarita Christian School (SCCS) is a private Christian school in Santa Clarita, California, United States. It serves students from kindergarten to 12th grade. It is a ministry of the Santa Clarita Baptist Church, and competes in the Heritage League athletic conference.

In 2022, the L.A. Times reported that the school had been cited seven times and sent a cease and desist by the Los Angeles County Department of Public Health for repeated COVID-19 related violations, including denying access to a health inspector.

References

External links
Official website

Christian schools in California
Education in Santa Clarita, California
1982 establishments in California